Akram Abdel-Majeed (born July 7, 1970), is a former Egyptian professional footballer.

Honours

Zamalek
Egypt Cup: 1
 1999
Afro-Asian Club Championship: 1
 1997

References

Zamalek SC players
Egyptian footballers
1970 births
Living people
Egyptian Premier League players
Association football forwards
People from Gharbia Governorate